The 1990 East Texas State Lions football team represented East Texas State University—now known as Texas A&M University–Commerce—as a member of the Lone Star Conference (LSC) during the 1990 NCAA Division II football season. Led by fifth-year head coach Eddie Vowell, the Lions compiled an overall record of 10–3 with a mark of 7–0 in conference play, winning the LSC title for the first time since 1983. The team played its home games at Memorial Stadium in Commerce, Texas. Wide receiver Gary Compton was a Harlon Hill Trophy nominee.

Schedule

Awards 
Harlon Hill Trophy Nominee: Gary Compton

All-Americans
Terry Bagsby, Defensive End, First Team
Dwayne Phorne, Offensive Line, Second Team
Eric Turner, Defensive Back, Second Team

All-Lone Star Conference

LSC Superlatives
Coach of The Year: Eddie Vowell
Defensive Player of the Year: Terry Bagsby
Outstanding Lineman of The Year: Terry Bagsby
Offensive Back of the Year: Bobby Bounds
Outstanding Back of the Year: Gary Compton

LSC First Team
Terry Bagsby, Defensive End
Bob Bounds, Quarterback  
Gary Compton, Tight End/Wide Receiver 
Jimmy Hooker, Safety
Dwayne Phorne, Offensive Tackle 
Chad Turner, Linebacker
Eric Turner, Cornerback
Billy Watkins, Placekicker
Jim White, Offensive Center

LSC Second Team
Micah Haley, Defensive Line 
Don Madden, Offensive Guard
Gary Perry, Running Back

LSC Honorable Mention
Brian Harp, Wide Receiver  
Lance Hyder, Defensive End
Willie Mozeke, Running Back
Joseph Showell, Offensive Tackle
Finis Turner, Safety

References

East Texas
Texas A&M–Commerce Lions football seasons
Lone Star Conference football champion seasons
Texas AandM-Commerce Lions football